The 57th Filmfare Awards South ceremony honoring the winners and nominees of the best of South Indian cinema in 2009 was held on 7 August 2010 in Chennai, India.

Nominations

The Filmfare Best Film Award is given by the Filmfare magazine as part of its annual Filmfare Awards for Hindi films. The award was first given in 1954.

The following is a list of the award winners and nominees.

Multiple nominations and awards
The following films received multiple nominations.

Kannada

Nominations
 8 nominations: MaLeyali Jotheyali
 7 nominations: Josh
 6 nominations: Love Guru and Parichaya
 5 nominations: Savaari
 4 nominations: Eddelu Manjunatha
 3 nominations: Kallara Santhe, Raaj The Showman and Ram
 2 nominations: Birugali and Manasaare
 1 nomination: Ambari

Awards
 2 awards: Eddelu Manjunatha*, Josh and MaLeyali Jotheyali
 1 award: Ambari, Birugali, Love Guru, Manasaare, Raaj The Showman and Savaari

Malayalam

Nominations
 7 nominations: Bhagyadevatha, Pazhassi Raja
 6 nominations: Bhramaram
 4 nominations: Evidam Swargamanu, Neelathaamara, Paleri Manikyam and Robin Hood
 3 nominations: Passenger, Puthiya Mukham
 2 nominations: Banaras and Swantham Lekhakan
 1 nomination: Kanakanmani, Moz & Cat, Ritu, Vilapangalkkapuram

Awards
 7 awards: Pazhassi Raja
 2 awards: Paleri Manikyam
 1 award:  Bhramaram* and Neelathaamara

Tamil

Nominations
 11 nominations: Ayan
 7 nominations: Pasanga
 6 nominations: Naan Kadavul
 5 nominations: Kanchivaram, Aadhavan
 4 nominations: Vettaikaaran
 3 nominations: Naadodigal
 2 nominations: Kanden Kadhalai, Kanthaswamy, Peranmai, Unnaipol Oruvan and Villu
 1 nomination: Achchamundu! Achchamundu!, Padikathavan, Pokkisham and Vennila Kabadi Kuzhu

Awards
 4 awards: Kanchivaram*
 3 awards: Ayan and Aadhavan
 2 awards: Naadodigal*
 1 awards: Naan Kadavul and Pasanga

Telugu

Nominations
 9 nominations: Arundhati and Magadheera
 7 nominations: Arya 2
 5 nominations: Konchem Ishtam Konchem Kashtam
 4 nominations: Kick
 3 nominations: Eenadu and Gopi Gopika Godavari
 2 nominations: Billa, Mahatma and Prayanam
 1 nomination: Aakasamantha, Banam, Ek Niranjan, Oy! and Pravarakhyudu

Awards
 6 awards: Magadheera*
 2 awards: Arundhati
 1 award: Arya 2, Josh*, Konchem Ishtam Konchem Kashtam, Mahatma and Oy!*

*: Includes one special award, which has no nominees.

Awardees
Winners in bold, nominees listed under.

Kannada

Malayalam

Tamil

Telugu

Special awards 
Special Jury Awards: 
 Mohanlal – Bhramaram (Malayalam),
 Yuvan Shankar Raja – Oy! (Telugu),  
 Srinagar Kitty – Savaari (Kannada)
 Yagna Shetty – Eddelu Manjunatha (Kannada)
Best Male Debutant: Naga Chaitanya – Josh (Telugu)
Best Female Debutant: Abhinaya – Naadodigal (Tamil)
Best Cinematographer: 
 K.K. Senthil Kumar – Magadheera (Telugu)
Best Choreographers: 
 Prem Rakshith – Arya 2 (Telugu)
 Dinesh – Ayan (Tamil)
Lifetime Achievement Awards: 
 K. P. A. C. Lalitha
 Ambareesh

See also
Filmfare Awards South
Filmfare Awards
2009 in film
Tamil Nadu State Film Awards
Nandi Awards

References

External links
 
 

Nominations
 57th Filmfare Awards South Nominations Tamil
 57th Filmfare Awards South Nominations Telugu
 57th Filmfare Awards South Nominations Malayalam
 57th Filmfare Awards South Nominations Kannada

Wins
 57th Filmfare Awards South Winners (Article)
 57th Filmfare Awards South Winners (list)

Filmfare Awards South
2010 Indian film awards